
Gmina Poraj is a rural gmina (administrative district) in Myszków County, Silesian Voivodeship, in southern Poland.

Villages
Gmina Poraj contains the villages and settlements of Choroń, Choroń-Baranowizna, Choroń-Rajczykowizna, Dębowiec, Gęzyn, Jastrząb, Kuźnica Stara, Kuźnica-Folwark, Masłońskie, Poraj, Pustkowie Gęzyńskie and Żarki-Letnisko.

Neighbouring gminas
Gmina Poraj is bordered by the town of Myszków and by the gminas of Kamienica Polska, Koziegłowy, Olsztyn and Żarki.

Twin towns – sister cities

Gmina Poraj is twinned with:
 Belá-Dulice, Slovakia
 Pohořelice, Czech Republic
 Vilnius District Municipality, Lithuania

References

Poraj
Myszków County